Paul Amorese (born June 6, 1979) is an American drummer and percussionist from Rochester, New York. He has performed and toured with a variety of musical groups, including Bacci, the WMDs, The Commuters, Jack Dishel and Only Son, Visible from Space, Bryan Scary, Hypnotic Clambake, Boutros Boutros, and goodbyemotel. He also works as a session drummer and is currently based out of Brooklyn, NY.

Biography
Amorese grew up in Rochester, New York, where he began drumming at a young age, performing with several marching bands. At the age of 14, he began playing at local Rochester bars with funk-rock band Boutros Boutros. He began touring extensively in 1999, with Hypnotic Clambake, a band from Boston, Massachusetts, known for its eclectic mix of musical genres. In 2002, he cofounded the folk/soul/hip hop group Bacci with guitarist, singer-songwriter Pete Bagale. 
Amorese has shared the stage with a wide variety of artists, including John Mayer, Fishbone, Wyclef Jean, John Entwistle (of The Who), Tommy Chong, Jefferson Starship, Jesse McCartney and Joss Stone.

Active Projects
Amorese currently performs with Jack Dishel and Only Son, Bacci, Matt and Alyssa (Tinted Image), Bryan Scary, and the Melbourne rock band goodbyemotel. goodbyemotel is making a name for themselves with their "4D Live Music Experience," during which the band performs in front of a scrim onto which 3D images are projected. The band's music has been featured on the television show Gossip Girl as well as in a 2013 commercial for Chrysler Australia. Amorese was heavily involved in the songwriting process for goodbyemotel's album If, which is scheduled for a March 2014 release. If was produced by Kevin Killen, who has also worked with U2, Kate Bush, and Peter Gabriel.

Based out of Brooklyn, NY, Amorese maintains a busy schedule as a live drummer, intermittently touring the United States, Europe, and Japan to perform. He also works regularly as a studio musician.

Discography
Bacci: Hey Girl (2003)
Bacci: More (2005)
Visible from Space: Fly (2006) 
The WMDs: The WMDs (2007)
The WMDs: We Are Waves (2009)
The Commuters: Rescue (2012)
Visible from Space: Dreams (2012)
goodbyemotel: If (2014)

References

External links
 Official Paul Amorese website
 Paul Amorese on Twitter

1979 births
Living people
Singers from New York (state)
20th-century American drummers
American male drummers
21st-century American drummers
20th-century American male musicians
21st-century American male singers
21st-century American singers
Hypnotic Clambake members